Sergei Simeonov Ignatov (born August 6, 1960) is a Bulgarian Egyptologist and politician, minister of education, youth and science from November 2009 to 28 January 2013.

Ignatov was born in Vidin, Bulgaria on 6 August 1960. He graduated with a degree in Egyptology from Leningrad State University in 1985 and later specialized in All Souls College, Oxford. He was lecturer and later associated professor at the Sofia University (1985–1996) and at New Bulgarian University (1994–2009), dean of the bachelor faculty (1998–2002) and chancellor of NBU (2002–2009). Sergei Ignatov is Rector of European Humanities University in Vilnus, Lithuania (since 2018).

In November 2010, Ignatov joined the Bulgarian National Science Fund (BNSF), but following corruption investigation resigned on 4 February 2013. Ignatov is an MEP of political party GERB.

References

References
 "The [Egyptian] tsar.." that was abandoned: „Изоставеният цар…“ в египетската литература. – В: Мит, изкуство, фолклор 7. Сборник в чест на акад. Д. Раевски. С., 2001, с. 452 – 463.

External links

1960 births
Living people
Bulgarian Egyptologists
20th-century Bulgarian historians
Bulgarian expatriates in England
Bulgarian expatriates in Russia
GERB politicians
Government ministers of Bulgaria
Alumni of All Souls College, Oxford
Academic staff of New Bulgarian University
Saint Petersburg State University alumni
Academic staff of Sofia University
People from Vidin
21st-century Bulgarian historians